Kim Chung-yum (3 January 1924 – 25 April 2020) was a South Korean politician. Under President Park Chung-hee, he was the longest serving chief presidential secretary in South Korean history. He also served as Minister of Finance and Minister of Commerce and Industry, playing a leading role in the country's miraculous economic development.

Kim died on April 25, 2020.

Publications
 From Despair to Hope: Economic Policymaking in Korea, 1945-1979

See also
 Miracle on the Han River
 Chief Presidential Secretary
 Park Chung-hee

References

1924 births
Clark University alumni
2020 deaths
People from Seoul
Government ministers of South Korea
Finance ministers of South Korea
South Korean diplomats
South Korean Buddhists
Ambassadors of South Korea to Japan
Chiefs of Staff to the President of South Korea